Clarence Douglas "Clare" McKerrow (January 18, 1877 – October 20, 1959) was a Canadian athlete. McKerrow competed in lacrosse for Canada in the 1908 Summer Olympics. McKerrow also played ice hockey  with the Montreal Hockey Club and won two Stanley Cup titles with the team; in 1895 as a player, and in 1902 as a trainer.

He was born in Montreal, Quebec.

Career
As an ice hockey player an 18-year old McKerrow, weighing only 115 pounds at the time and considered too young and too light for senior hockey, sat on the Montreal Hockey Club bench for the entirety of the 1894–95 regular season. But when Billy Barlow was absent for the March 9, 1895 Stanley Cup challenge game against the Queen's University team of the OHA, McKerrow was called upon to play, scoring a goal while his team defended the Stanley Cup, and from there on he was a fixture on the team roster.

In March 1902 McKerrow coached the Montreal Hokey Club, then dubbed the "Little Men of Iron" because of the small stature of many of its players (including Dickie Boon, Archie Hooper, Jimmy Gardner and Jack Marshall), to a Stanley Cup victory over the Winnipeg Victorias.

In 1908 he was part of the Canadian lacrosse team which won the gold medal in the Summer Olympics, alongside future ice hockey magnate Tommy Gorman.

McKerrow died in Montreal on October 20, 1959.

Statistics

Ice hockey

Source:

Referenser

External links
Clary MacKerrow at Sports Reference

1877 births
1959 deaths
Canadian lacrosse players
Canadian ice hockey players
Canadian ice hockey coaches
Lacrosse players at the 1908 Summer Olympics
Medalists at the 1908 Summer Olympics
Olympic lacrosse players of Canada
Olympic gold medalists for Canada
Olympic medalists in lacrosse
Ice hockey people from Montreal
Montreal Hockey Club players
Sportspeople from Montreal